Ilunga Adell (born William Adell Stevenson on November 27, 1948) is an American television and film producer, screenwriter, and actor who has written for many television series, primarily sitcoms, such as Sanford and Son, 227, A Different World, Married... with Children, Roc and Moesha. Ilunga also produced the teen-themed series City Guys, for which he also has written several episodes, the short-lived TV series Up and Coming, and My Brother and Me.

References

External links

1948 births
Living people
American male film actors
American male screenwriters
African-American film producers
Film producers from Tennessee
African-American television producers
African-American male actors
People from Memphis, Tennessee
African-American screenwriters
Screenwriters from Tennessee
21st-century African-American people
20th-century African-American people
Television producers from Tennessee
African-American male writers